The Wiener Kammerchor is a chamber choir founded in Vienna in 1947 by the musicologist Franz Andreas Weißenbäck - he was also its music director for many years. In 1995 it merged with the Kammerchor der Musikhochschule Wien and since then it has mainly consisted of students and graduates from the Musikhochschule. From 1995 to 2007 its music director was Johannes Prinz - he was succeeded by its current music director Michael Grohotolsky.

External links

Musical groups established in 1947
Austrian choirs
Chamber choirs